Axel Müller may refer to:

 Axel Müller (archer) (born 1992), Swiss archer
 Axel Müller (rugby union) (born 1993), Argentine rugby union player
 Axel Müller (footballer) (born 1996), Uruguayan association footballer
 Axel Müller (politician) (born 1963), German politician